Neo-Neon Holdings Limited is a decorative lighting company stationed in Hong Kong. It engages in the research, development, manufacturing and distribution of lighting products including incandescent, LED, decorative and entertainment lighting products.

History
1979: Neo-Neon was founded in Taiwan by Mr. Ben Fan.
1989: It moved its production force to Heshan, Guangdong in Mainland China.
1996: It began investing in R&D for decorative lights.
2002: It achieved mass production of LED decorative lights.
2006: Its products expanded to commercial lighting products which include high-intensity discharge lamps, and compact fluorescent, RGB LED, amber white blue and white LED technologies. It was listed on the Hong Kong Stock Exchange with an IPO price of HK$6.9 per share.

References

External links
Neo-Neon Holdings Limited (English)
Neo-Neon Holdings Limited (Chinese)
Neo-Neon Holdings Limited (Chinese)

Companies listed on the Hong Kong Stock Exchange
Electronics companies established in 1979
Companies based in Guangdong
Neon lighting
Manufacturing companies of Hong Kong
Privately held companies of China
Signage companies